David Hewitt is a retired Irish rugby union player. Playing at centre, he gained 18 caps for Ireland between 1958 and 1965, in addition to winning six Lions caps in 1959 and 1962. He was educated at the Royal Belfast Academical Institution and also represented Queen's University, Instonians, North of Ireland F.C. and Ulster.

References

1939 births
Queen's University RFC players
Instonians rugby union players
North of Ireland F.C. players
Ulster Rugby players
Irish rugby union players
Ireland international rugby union players
Living people
British & Irish Lions rugby union players from Ireland
Rugby union players from Belfast
Rugby union centres